Amades (modern Greek: Αμάδες) is a semi mountainous small village located in the Northeastern area of Chios island, in Greece. After the ratification of the Greek law of Kallikrates, Amades belongs to the municipal unit of  Kardamyla within the municipality of Chios. According to the last census, which took place in 2011, the permanent population of Amades is 140 people.

History 
It is said that the very first inhabitants of the village were Pelasgians who came from Thessaly and who believed in the Pelinean Zeus, whom the  mountain near the village is named after. How this village took its name is not certain. The most common explanation is that it took its name from the ancient game amada (modern Greek: Αμάδα), where each participant had a small stone and within a specific perimeter they tried to hit the others’ stones. The contemporary game of Amada is said to be like billiards or  bowling.

Economy 
The most common occupation for the inhabitants is  farming. Most own land on which they cultivate vegetables and other crops. Additionally, the village is known for the production of olive oil.

Architecture 
Early houses were typically built from stone and wood. In most cases each house consisted of two, maximum three rooms. Later houses were built according to more modern standards.

Attractions 
Apart from the chance to hike on Pelinaio mountain or swim to the village's beach, visitors may be delighted to taste local dishes in the tavern near the river and under the huge tree of Hippocrates, Platanus.

References 

Populated places in Chios